4T or 4-T may refer to:

Biology and chemistry
4-T-TRIS; see Thiotrisescaline
4-t-butylpyrocatechol; see 4-tert-Butylcatechol
4T-MMDA-2; see MMDA

Locomotives 
4T class of locomotive
LMS Stanier 2-6-4T (disambiguation)
LMS 3-Cylindered Stanier 2-6-4T
LMS Fairburn 2-6-4T
LMS Fowler 2-6-4T
Bristol and Exeter Railway 4-2-4T locomotives
LMS/BR Class 4 2-6-4T locomotives
BR Standard Class 4 2-6-4T
LMS 2-Cylindered Stanier 2-6-4T
L&YR Hughes 4-6-4T
LMS Stanier Class 2 0-4-4T
Highland Railway Drummond 0-6-4T Class
Highland Railway Drummond 0-4-4T Class
0-8-4T
2-6-4T; see  2-6-4
0-4-4T; see 0-4-4
4-6-4T; see 4-6-4
0-6-4T; see 0-6-4
2-8-4T; see 2-8-4
2-2-4T; see 2-2-4
2-4-4T; see  2-4-4

Other
4T-GTE, a model of Toyota T engine
4T, a model of LWD Szpak, a Polish utility aircraft
Piaggio Zip 4T, an urban scooter
4T – Vietnam Youth Education Support Center
4T, the production code for the 1977 Doctor Who serial The Invisible Enemy
Fourth Transformation, 2018 campaign promise by Mexico's president to do away with abuses that plagued that nation.

See also
 The Four T's (disambiguation)
T4 (disambiguation)
 TTTT